Trechus is a genus of ground beetle native to the Palearctic (including Europe) and the Near East. There are more than 1,000 described species in Trechus.

The name of the genus is derived from the Greek word trécho, meaning "I run".

The genus Trechus contains the following species:

A

 Trechus abakumovi Belousov & Kabak, 1996
 Trechus abalkhasimi J.Schmidt & Faille, 2018
 Trechus abdurakhmanovi Belousov, 1990
 Trechus abeillei Pandellé, 1872
 Trechus academiae Deuve, 1992
 Trechus achillecasalei Deuve, 1998
 Trechus acuticollis Sciaky & Pavesi, 1994
 Trechus adaba J.Schmidt & Faille, 2018
 Trechus additus J.Schmidt, 2016
 Trechus aduncus Barr, 1962
 Trechus adustus Jeannel, 1962
 Trechus aedeagalis J.Schmidt, 2009
 Trechus aethiopicus Alluaud, 1918
 Trechus aghiazicus Belousov & Kabak, 2019
 Trechus agni Deuve & Queinnec, 1985
 Trechus agouzicus Deuve & Queinnec, 1992
 Trechus akibensis Belousov, 1990
 Trechus akkusianus Donabauer, 2006
 Trechus aksuensis Belousov & Kabak, 1996
 Trechus alajensis Belousov & Kabak, 1994
 Trechus alanicus Belousov, 1990
 Trechus albanicus Apfelbeck, 1905
 Trechus algiricus Jeannel, 1922
 Trechus alicantinus Español, 1971
 Trechus alinae Dajoz, 1990
 Trechus almonius Reitter, 1903
 Trechus alpicola Sturm, 1825
 Trechus alpigradus Reitter, 1888
 Trechus alticola Wollaston, 1854
 Trechus altitudinum Deuve, 2004
 Trechus amasraensis Donabauer, 2004
 Trechus ambarasensis Jeannel, 1954
 Trechus amblus Jeannel, 1935
 Trechus amblygonellus Jeannel, 1964
 Trechus amblygonus Jeannel, 1935
 Trechus ambrolauricus Belousov, 1989
 Trechus amharicus Ortuño & Novoa, 2011
 Trechus amicorum P.Moravec & Wrase, 1998
 Trechus amplicollis Fairmaire, 1859
 Trechus anae Morvan, 1982
 Trechus andreinii Jeannel, 1921
 Trechus angavoensis J.Schmidt & Faille, 2018
 Trechus angelae Magrini, 1984
 Trechus angelicae Reitter, 1892
 Trechus angulifer Belousov & Kabak, 1992
 Trechus angusticeps Apfelbeck, 1904
 Trechus angusticollis Kiesenwetter, 1850
 Trechus anichtchenkoi Toribio, 2012
 Trechus animosus Jeannel, 1962
 Trechus anjuensis Deuve, 1998
 Trechus antonii Jeannel, 1936
 Trechus antonini Deuve, 1998
 Trechus apache Dajoz, 1990
 Trechus apicalis Motschulsky, 1845
 Trechus apoduvalipenis Salgado & Ortuño, 1998
 Trechus apusenicus P.Moravec, 1986
 Trechus aquilus Jeannel, 1962
 Trechus arambourgi Jeannel, 1935
 Trechus arizonae Casey, 1918
 Trechus armenus Iablokoff-Khnzorian, 1963
 Trechus arnoldii Belousov, 1987
 Trechus arrecheai Ortuño; Gilgado & Cuesta, 2014
 Trechus arribasi Jeanne, 1988
 Trechus arshanicus Belousov & Kabak, 2001
 Trechus artemisiae Putzeys, 1872
 Trechus arthuri P.Moravec & Lompe in Löbl & Smetana, 2003
 Trechus asiaticus Jeannel, 1927
 Trechus assingi Lompe, 1999
 Trechus astrophilus J.Schmidt, 2009
 Trechus atomus P.Moravec & Wrase, 1998
 Trechus aubei Pandellé, 1867
 Trechus aubryi Coiffait, 1953
 Trechus aurouxi (Mateu & Comas, 2006)
 Trechus austriacus Dejean, 1831
 Trechus avgolensis Belousov & Kabak, 1998
 Trechus aztec Jeannel, 1920

B

 Trechus babaensis Lompe, 2015
 Trechus babaulti Jeannel, 1935
 Trechus babinjensis Jeannel, 1927
 Trechus badius Jeannel, 1960
 Trechus badzhalicus Plutenko, 2004
 Trechus bajankoli Belousov & Kabak, 1992
 Trechus bakeri Jeannel, 1923
 Trechus bakurovi Shilenkov, 1984
 Trechus baleensis (Basilewsky, 1974)
 Trechus balesilvestris J.Schmidt & Faille, 2018
 Trechus balfourbrownei Ueno, 1965
 Trechus balkaricus Belousov, 1990
 Trechus balsamensis Barr, 1962
 Trechus bannaticus Dejean, 1831
 Trechus barahbisensis Deuve, 1988
 Trechus barbaritae Donabauer, 2004
 Trechus barberi (Jeannel, 1931)
 Trechus barii Focarile, 1949
 Trechus barnevillei Pandellé, 1867
 Trechus barratxinai Español, 1971
 Trechus basarukini P.Moravec & Wrase, 1997
 Trechus basilewskianus Geginat, 2008
 Trechus basilewskyi Jeannel, 1960
 Trechus baskonicus Belousov & Kabak, 1996
 Trechus bastianinii Magrini & Sciaky, 2006
 Trechus bastropi J.Schmidt, 2009
 Trechus batuensis Magrini & Sciaky, 2006
 Trechus batyr Belousov & Kabak, 1992
 Trechus bayanbulak Deuve, 1993
 Trechus baztanensis Dupré, 1991
 Trechus beatus Reitter, 1903
 Trechus bedeli Jeannel, 1922
 Trechus beesoni Jeannel, 1930
 Trechus beghinorum Belousov & Kabak, 1992
 Trechus beieri Winkler, 1936
 Trechus belovi Belousov & Kabak, 1996
 Trechus beltrani Toribio, 1990
 Trechus benahoaritus Machado, 1989
 Trechus benesi Deuve, 1993
 Trechus bensai Jeannel, 1927
 Trechus besucheti Pawlowski, 1977
 Trechus besuchetianus Deuve, 1987
 Trechus beusti (L.Schaufuss, 1863)
 Trechus bhadarwahensis Deuve, 1982
 Trechus bhutanicus Ueno, 1977
 Trechus bianericus Belousov & Kabak, 2020
 Trechus bibulus Lompe, 1999
 Trechus biharicus Meixner, 1912
 Trechus binotatus Putzeys, 1870
 Trechus bipartitus Raffray, 1886
 Trechus bodemeyeri Reitter, 1913
 Trechus bogatshevi Belousov, 1987
 Trechus bogdani Belousov & Kabak, 2000
 Trechus bogdoensis Belousov & Kabak, 2001
 Trechus boghinorum Belousov & Kabak, 1992
 Trechus bohaci P.Moravec, 1987
 Trechus bohemorum Pawlowski, 1973
 Trechus boleslavi Belousov & Kabak, 2000
 Trechus boludagensis Donabauer, 2006
 Trechus bombi J.Schmidt & Faille, 2018
 Trechus bonvouloiri Pandellé, 1867
 Trechus bordei Peyerimhoff, 1909
 Trechus bosnicus Ganglbauer, 1891
 Trechus boudikae Morvan, 1982
 Trechus bouilloni Faille; Bourdeau & Fresneda, 2012
 Trechus boulbeni Deuve, 1998
 Trechus bourdeaui Fresneda; Valenzuela & Faille, 2015
 Trechus bowlingi Barr, 1962
 Trechus bradycelliformis Csiki, 1906
 Trechus brancuccii Deuve, 2006
 Trechus brendelli Deuve, 2005
 Trechus breuili Jeannel, 1913
 Trechus breuningi Morvan, 1972
 Trechus brevicaudis Belousov & Kabak, 1993
 Trechus brevicorpus Belousov & Kabak, 1993
 Trechus brezinai Deuve & Queinnec, 1992
 Trechus bruckii Fairmaire, 1862
 Trechus bruckoides Faille; Bourdeau & Fresneda, 2012
 Trechus buahitensis Jeannel, 1954
 Trechus budhaensis J.Schmidt, 2009
 Trechus byzantinus Apfelbeck, 1901

C

 Trechus cabrerai (Jeannel, 1936)
 Trechus calashensis Deuve, 1982
 Trechus caliginis Barr, 1985
 Trechus cameroni Jeannel, 1923
 Trechus cantalicus Fauvel, 1888
 Trechus cappadocicus Pawlowski, 1976
 Trechus caprai Jeannel, 1927
 Trechus cardioderus Putzeys, 1870
 Trechus carilloi Toribio & Rodriguez, 1997
 Trechus carnioliae G.Müller, 1921
 Trechus carolinae Schaeffer, 1901
 Trechus carpaticus Rybinski, 1902
 Trechus caspiricus Deuve, 1982
 Trechus catensis Donabauer, 2013
 Trechus cathaicus Sciaky & Pavesi, 1995
 Trechus caucasicus Chaudoir, 1846
 Trechus cautus Wollaston, 1854
 Trechus cavernicola J.Frivaldszky, 1881
 Trechus ceballosi Mateu, 1953
 Trechus centralis Nonveiller; Pavicevic & Popovic, 1994
 Trechus cephalonicus Winkler, 1914
 Trechus cephalotellus Belousov in Kryzhanovskij et al., 1995
 Trechus ceresai Binaghi, 1938
 Trechus chalybeus Dejean, 1831
 Trechus championi Jeannel, 1920
 Trechus changbaicola Deuve, 2017
 Trechus chappuisi Jeannel, 1935
 Trechus cheoahensis Donabauer, 2005
 Trechus chiguguanensis Belousov & Kabak, 2020
 Trechus chillalicus Jeannel, 1936
 Trechus chodjaii Morvan, 1974
 Trechus chokensis Pawlowski, 2002
 Trechus cholaensis Deuve, 1996
 Trechus chormaensis Deuve, 1993
 Trechus christinae J.Schmidt, 2016
 Trechus cifrianae Ortuño & Jimenez-Valverde, 2011
 Trechus clarkeianus (Basilewsky, 1974)
 Trechus claudiae Deuve, 1996
 Trechus clingmanensis Donabauer, 2005
 Trechus coelestis Sciaky & Pavesi, 1994
 Trechus colobus J.Schmidt & Faille, 2018
 Trechus coloradensis Schaeffer, 1915
 Trechus comasi Hernando, 2002
 Trechus compactulus Belousov & Kabak, 1996
 Trechus compsus Jeannel, 1935
 Trechus concinnus Tschitscherine, 1904
 Trechus concoloratus Lorenz, 1998
 Trechus conformis Jeannel, 1927
 Trechus confusatorius Deuve & Kaiser, 2009
 Trechus consobrinus K. & J.Daniel, 1898
 Trechus constrictus Schaum, 1860
 Trechus controversus Binaghi, 1959
 Trechus coweensis Barr, 1979
 Trechus crassiscapus Lindroth, 1955
 Trechus cratocephalus Belousov & Kabak, 2019
 Trechus croaticus Dejean, 1831
 Trechus croceus Fresneda; Valenzuela; Bourdeau & Faille, 2019
 Trechus crucifer Piochard de la Brûlerie, 1876
 Trechus cryobius Jeannel, 1935
 Trechus cryptophilus Belousov & Kabak, 1992
 Trechus culminicola Jeannel, 1936
 Trechus cumberlandus Barr, 1962
 Trechus cuniculorum Mequignon, 1921
 Trechus curticollis Fairmaire, 1866
 Trechus curvatilis Belousov & Kabak, 1998
 Trechus cuspis Belousov & Kabak, 2020
 Trechus custos Wollaston, 1854
 Trechus cyclomus Jeannel, 1954
 Trechus cyprinus Franz, 1987

D

 Trechus dabanensis Sciaky & Pavesi, 1994
 Trechus dabanshanicola Deuve, 2011
 Trechus dacatraianus Deuve, 1996
 Trechus dakushitaicus Deuve, 2004
 Trechus damchungensis Deuve, 1998
 Trechus danieli Holdhaus, 1902
 Trechus daoensis Belousov & Kabak, 2001
 Trechus davanensis Sciaky & Pavesi, 1994
 Trechus davidiani Belousov, 1990
 Trechus davidwrasei Donabauer, 2007
 Trechus dayanae Assmann & Wrase, 2012
 Trechus debilis Wollaston, 1871
 Trechus decolor Jeannel, 1938
 Trechus degienensis Jeannel, 1954
 Trechus delarouzeei Pandellé, 1867
 Trechus delhermi Saulcy, 1880
 Trechus deliae Morvan, 1971
 Trechus demircapicus P.Moravec, 1986
 Trechus demissus Jeannel, 1962
 Trechus densicornis (Fischhuber, 1977)
 Trechus depressipenis Sciaky & Pavesi, 1995
 Trechus depressipennis J.Schmidt & Faille, 2018
 Trechus deqenensis Deuve, 2017
 Trechus detersus Wollaston, 1864
 Trechus dichrous Reitter, 1911
 Trechus diecki Putzeys, 1870
 Trechus dilizhanicus Belousov, 1989
 Trechus dilutus Wollaston, 1854
 Trechus dimorphicus Pawlowski, 2002
 Trechus diogenes Pawlowski, 1979
 Trechus dioscuricus Belousov, 1990
 Trechus distigma Kiesenwetter, 1851
 Trechus distinctus Fairmaire & Laboulbène, 1854
 Trechus djebalicus (Comas & Mateu, 2008)
 Trechus djebelgloubensis Quéinnec & Ollivier, 2013
 Trechus doderoi Jeannel, 1927
 Trechus dodola J.Schmidt & Faille, 2018
 Trechus dolomitanus Jeannel, 1931
 Trechus donabaueri Lebenbauer, 2004
 Trechus dongola J.Schmidt, 2016
 Trechus dongulaensis J.Schmidt, 2009
 Trechus dostali Donabauer, 2007
 Trechus dromai J.Schmidt, 2016
 Trechus dubitans Reitter, 1903
 Trechus dudkorum Belousov & Kabak, 1996
 Trechus dulat Belousov & Kabak, 1992
 Trechus dumitrescui Decou, 1959
 Trechus duvalioides Deuve, 2004
 Trechus dzermukensis Iablokoff-Khnzorian, 1963
 Trechus dzhalair Belousov & Kabak, 1994
 Trechus dzhungaricus Belousov & Kabak, 1992
 Trechus dzykhvensis Belousov, 1990

E

 Trechus echarouxi Ollivier & Queinnec, 2011
 Trechus egorovi Belousov & Kabak, 1996
 Trechus egregius Jeannel, 1927
 Trechus elburzensis Morvan, 1974
 Trechus elegans Putzeys, 1847
 Trechus elgonicus Jeannel, 1930
 Trechus elongatulus Putzeys, 1870
 Trechus enedaphos Fresneda; Valenzuela; Bourdeau & Faille, 2019
 Trechus enigmaticus Coiffait, 1971
 Trechus enoploides Jeannel, 1954
 Trechus enoplus Jeannel, 1935
 Trechus epirotes Colas, 1957
 Trechus eremita J.Schmidt, 2009
 Trechus ericalis Magrini; Queinnec & Vigna Taglianti, 2013
 Trechus erythrostomus Deuve, 1987
 Trechus escalerae Abeille de Perrin, 1903
 Trechus espanyoli (Mateu & Escola, 2006)
 Trechus eutrechoides Deuve, 1992
 Trechus exilipenis Belousov & Kabak, 1994

F

 Trechus fadriquei (Mateu & Escola, 2006)
 Trechus fairmairei Pandellé, 1867
 Trechus felix Wollaston, 1864
 Trechus ferghanicus Belousov & Kabak, 1992
 Trechus fischtensis Reitter, 1888
 Trechus fisehai J.Schmidt & Faille, 2018
 Trechus flavocinctus Jeannel, 1922
 Trechus flavocircumdatus Jeannel, 1922
 Trechus flavolimbatus Wollaston, 1863
 Trechus flavomarginatus Wollaston, 1854
 Trechus focarilei Monguzzi, 1998
 Trechus folwarcznyi Deuve, 1998
 Trechus fongondi Deuve & Queinnec, 1983
 Trechus fontinalis Rybinski, 1901
 Trechus fortimanus Reitter, 1903
 Trechus fortunatus Jeannel, 1927
 Trechus franzianus Mateu & Deuve, 1979
 Trechus franzschuberti Donabauer, 2006
 Trechus frater J.Schmidt, 2016
 Trechus frigophilus J.Schmidt, 2016
 Trechus fritzbeneschi Donabauer, 2006
 Trechus fubianensis Deuve, 2009
 Trechus fulvatilis Belousov & Kabak, 1998
 Trechus fulvus Dejean, 1831
 Trechus fusculus Motschulsky, 1850

G

 Trechus gagrensis Jeannel, 1927
 Trechus galianus Belousov, 1989
 Trechus galicicaensis B.V.Gueorguiev & Hristovski, 2010
 Trechus gallaecus Jeannel, 1921
 Trechus gallorites Jeannel, 1936
 Trechus gamae Reboleira & Serrano, 2009
 Trechus gansuensis Deuve & Queinnec, 1993
 Trechus gemaensis Belousov & Kabak, 2020
 Trechus genevanorum Pawlowski, 1977
 Trechus gigas Pawlowski, 2002
 Trechus gigoni (Casale, 1982)
 Trechus gitzeni Belousov & Kabak, 2001
 Trechus glabratus J.Schmidt, 2009
 Trechus glacialis Heer, 1837
 Trechus glebi Belousov & Kabak, 2019
 Trechus gloriensis Jeanne, 1971
 Trechus goebli Breit, 1914
 Trechus goelkoeyensis Donabauer, 2013
 Trechus goidanichi Focarile & Casale, 1978
 Trechus goliath Belousov & Kabak, 1992
 Trechus golovatchi Casale, 1983
 Trechus gomerensis Franz, 1986
 Trechus gongshanensis Deuve & Kavanaugh, 2016
 Trechus gorkhai J.Schmidt, 1998
 Trechus gracilitarsis K. & J.Daniel, 1898
 Trechus gradloni Morvan, 1982
 Trechus grandiceps Reitter, 1885
 Trechus grandipennis J.Schmidt & Faille, 2018
 Trechus grandis Ganglbauer, 1891
 Trechus gravidus Putzeys, 1870
 Trechus grenieri Pandellé, 1867
 Trechus groubei (Antoine, 1936)
 Trechus guangaishanus Belousov & Kabak, 2001
 Trechus gugheensis Jeannel, 1950
 Trechus gulickai Löbl, 1967
 Trechus gurungi J.Schmidt, 1998
 Trechus gusevi Belousov, 1990
 Trechus gushensis Belousov & Kabak, 1998
 Trechus gwiomarchi Morvan, 1982
 Trechus gyalmo J.Schmidt, 2016
 Trechus gyalpo J.Schmidt, 2016
 Trechus gyatsola J.Schmidt, 2016
 Trechus gypaeti Vigna Taglianti & Magrini, 2009

H

 Trechus habaicus Deuve, 2011
 Trechus habashanensis Deuve, 2017
 Trechus hagenia J.Schmidt & Faille, 2018
 Trechus haggei J.Schmidt & Faille, 2018
 Trechus hajeki Reitter, 1913
 Trechus hampei Ganglbauer, 1891
 Trechus hangaicus Shilenkov, 1982
 Trechus haoe Barr, 1979
 Trechus haoeleadensis Donabauer, 2005
 Trechus harenna J.Schmidt & Faille, 2018
 Trechus harryi J.Schmidt & Faille, 2018
 Trechus hauseri Jeannel, 1962
 Trechus heinzianus Pawlowski, 1979
 Trechus hemsinensis Donabauer, 2013
 Trechus hendrichsi Mateu, 1974
 Trechus heniochicus Ljovuschkin, 1970
 Trechus hiekei J.Schmidt, 2016
 Trechus himalensis Deuve & Queinnec, 1985
 Trechus hingstoni Jeannel, 1928
 Trechus hodeberti Deuve, 1998
 Trechus holzun Shilenkov & Sokolov, 1987
 Trechus hoppi Jeannel, 1927
 Trechus houzhenziensis Deuve, 2001
 Trechus howellae Barr, 1979
 Trechus humboldti Van Dyke, 1945
 Trechus hummleri Jeannel, 1927
 Trechus hurrita Pavesi & Sciaky, 1990
 Trechus huzhubeiensis Deuve, 2011
 Trechus hydropicus G.Horn, 1883
 Trechus hylonomellus Lorenz, 1998
 Trechus hyperythros Fresneda; Valenzuela; Bourdeau & Faille, 2019

I

 Trechus iblanensis (Mateu & Escola, 2006)
 Trechus idriss Peyerimhoff, 1924
 Trechus ilgazensis Donabauer, 2004
 Trechus ilgazicus Pawlowski, 1976
 Trechus illyricus Jeannel, 1921
 Trechus imaicus Jeannel, 1923
 Trechus imereticus Belousov, 1990
 Trechus impunctus Casale, 1979
 Trechus imurai Ueno, 1999
 Trechus incisipenis Belousov & Kabak, 1999
 Trechus incola Peyerimhoff, 1909
 Trechus indicus Putzeys, 1870
 Trechus indicusoides Deuve, 2005
 Trechus inexpectatus Barr, 1985
 Trechus inexspectatus Belousov & Kabak, 2001
 Trechus infuscatus Chaudoir, 1850
 Trechus insolitus K.Daniel in K. & J.Daniel, 1906
 Trechus insubricus K. & J.Daniel, 1898
 Trechus iranicus Morvan & Pawlowski, 1977
 Trechus irenis Csiki, 1912
 Trechus iricolor Sciaky & Pavesi, 1995
 Trechus iridescens J.Schmidt & Faille, 2018
 Trechus irkeshtamicus Belousov & Kabak, 1998
 Trechus irritus Jeannel, 1960
 Trechus isabelae Borges & Serrano, 2007  (Cave ground-beetle)
 Trechus isfanensis Belousov & Kabak, 1998
 Trechus ispulensis Belousov & Kabak, 1992
 Trechus italicus K. & J.Daniel, 1898
 Trechus ithae Reitter, 1888

J

 Trechus jadodraconis Deuve, 1995
 Trechus jaechi Donabauer, 2006
 Trechus janaki P.Moravec, 1993
 Trechus janatai Belousov & Kabak, 2000
 Trechus jarrigei Morvan, 1972
 Trechus jeannei Sciaky, 1998
 Trechus jezerensis Apfelbeck, 1908
 Trechus jiuhensis Deuve & Liang, 2015
 Trechus jiuzhaiensis Deuve, 1998
 Trechus jorgensis Oromi & Borges, 1991  (Cave ground-beetle)
 Trechus jugivagus Lutshnik, 1930

K

 Trechus kabakovi Pawlowski, 1978
 Trechus kabylicus Casale, 1983
 Trechus kackardagi Pawlowski, 1978
 Trechus kaikanicus Belousov & Kabak, 1994
 Trechus kalabi Deuve & Queinnec, 1993
 Trechus kalabianus Deuve, 1993
 Trechus kangchenjunga J.Schmidt, 2016
 Trechus kantegiricus Belousov & Kabak, 1994
 Trechus karadenizus Pawlowski, 1976
 Trechus karasibensis Belousov & Kabak, 1994
 Trechus karlykensis Belousov & Kabak, 2001
 Trechus kashensis Belousov & Kabak, 2001
 Trechus kashgarensis Deuve, 1992
 Trechus kataevi Belousov, 1987
 Trechus katranicus Belousov & Kabak, 1996
 Trechus kaznakovi Jeannel, 1935
 Trechus keithi Ollivier; Pavicevic & Queinnec, 2008
 Trechus ketmenicus Belousov & Kabak, 1993
 Trechus kezadonicus Belousov, 1989
 Trechus khalabicus Belousov, 1990
 Trechus khaledicus Belousov, 1990
 Trechus khnzoriani Pawlowski, 1976
 Trechus khorgosicus Belousov & Kabak, 1994
 Trechus kiapazicus Belousov, 1990
 Trechus kimak Belousov & Kabak, 1996
 Trechus kobingeri Apfelbeck, 1902
 Trechus kocheri Paulian & Villiers, 1939
 Trechus kodoricus Belousov, 1989
 Trechus kokzhotensis Belousov & Kabak, 1996
 Trechus komarovi Belousov, 1990
 Trechus korae J.Schmidt, 2009
 Trechus korbi Reitter, 1903
 Trechus korotyaevi Shilenkov, 1982
 Trechus korrigani Morvan, 1982
 Trechus korzhun Belousov & Kabak, 1994
 Trechus kovali Belousov, 1989
 Trechus kozlovi Jeannel, 1935
 Trechus krasnovi Belousov & Kabak, 1992
 Trechus krejcii Deuve & Queinnec, 1985
 Trechus kricheldorffi Wagner, 1913
 Trechus kucerai Deuve, 2011
 Trechus kukunoricus Belousov & Kabak, 2000
 Trechus kulpensis Belousov & Kabak, 1998
 Trechus kuraicus Shilenkov, 1995
 Trechus kurbatovi Belousov & Kabak, 2000
 Trechus kurentzovi Lafer, 1989
 Trechus kurnakovi Jeannel, 1960
 Trechus kushtaicus Belousov & Kabak, 2001

L

 Trechus labrangensis Belousov & Kabak, 2000
 Trechus labruleriei Jeannel, 1921
 Trechus laevipes Jeannel, 1927
 Trechus lailensis Belousov, 1989
 Trechus lallemantii Fairmaire, 1859
 Trechus lama J.Schmidt, 2009
 Trechus lamjunensis J.Schmidt, 1994
 Trechus lampros Jeannel, 1935
 Trechus laranoensis Lompe, 1999
 Trechus larisae Belousov & Kabak, 1996
 Trechus lassallei Deuve, 1981
 Trechus latebricola Kiesenwetter, 1850
 Trechus latibuli Jeannel, 1948
 Trechus latior Darlington, 1959
 Trechus latiplatus Belousov & Kabak, 1998
 Trechus latus Putzeys, 1847
 Trechus laureticola Jeannel, 1936
 Trechus lazicus Pawlowski, 1976
 Trechus lebenbaueri Donabauer, 2004
 Trechus lebretae Jeannel, 1960
 Trechus lederi Putzeys, 1878
 Trechus ledouxianus Mateu & Deuve, 1979
 Trechus legorskyi Donabauer, 2013
 Trechus leleupi Jeannel, 1954
 Trechus lencinai (Mateu & Ortuño, 2006)
 Trechus lepineyi Paulian & Villiers, 1939
 Trechus lepontinus Ganglbauer, 1891
 Trechus letshkhumicus Belousov, 1989
 Trechus levillaini Morvan, 1982
 Trechus lgockii Pawlowski, 1978
 Trechus lhasaensis J.Schmidt, 2016
 Trechus libanensis Piochard de la Brûlerie, 1876
 Trechus liguricus Jeannel, 1921
 Trechus lijiangensis Belousov & Kabak, 2001
 Trechus limacodes Dejean, 1831
 Trechus lindbergi Coiffait, 1962
 Trechus linxiaicus Deuve, 2005
 Trechus liochrous Jeannel, 1935
 Trechus liopleurus Chaudoir, 1850
 Trechus litangensis Deuve, 1995
 Trechus loebli Pawlowski, 1977
 Trechus loeblianus Deuve, 1988
 Trechus loeffleri Magrini & Sciaky, 2006
 Trechus lomakini Belousov & Kabak, 1994
 Trechus longicollis Meixner, 1912
 Trechus longulus K. & J.Daniel, 1898
 Trechus lucidus Jeannel, 1960
 Trechus luculentus Barr, 1962
 Trechus lunai Reboleira & Serrano, 2009
 Trechus lundbladi Jeannel, 1938
 Trechus luquensis Belousov & Kabak, 2000
 Trechus lusitanicus Jeannel, 1921
 Trechus luteolus Jeannel, 1960
 Trechus lutshniki Belousov, 1987
 Trechus luzhangensis Deuve & Liang, 2016

M

 Trechus maceki Deuve, 1992
 Trechus machadoensis Franz, 1984
 Trechus machadoi Jeannel, 1941
 Trechus machardi Jeanne, 1976
 Trechus maculicornis Chaudoir, 1846
 Trechus maderensis Csiki, 1928
 Trechus magistrettii Focarile, 1949
 Trechus magniceps Reitter, 1898
 Trechus maisaicus Belousov & Kabak, 1994
 Trechus majusculus K.Daniel, 1902
 Trechus mallaszianus P.Moravec & Lompe in Löbl & Smetana, 2003
 Trechus mandarinus Sciaky & Pavesi, 1995
 Trechus manensis Belousov & Kabak, 1994
 Trechus manzhangicus Deuve, 2004
 Trechus maomao Deuve, 2005
 Trechus maoniu Belousov & Kabak, 2020
 Trechus maowenensis Deuve, 1995
 Trechus maqenicus Deuve, 2004
 Trechus maquensis Deuve, 2004
 Trechus marcilhaci Pham, 1987
 Trechus marcilhacianus Deuve, 2004
 Trechus margelanicus Belousov & Kabak, 1998
 Trechus marginalis Schaum in Kraatz, 1862
 Trechus maritimus Sainte-Claire Deville, 1907
 Trechus markakolensis Belousov & Kabak, 1999
 Trechus martelluccii Magrini & Sciaky, 2006
 Trechus martensi Deuve & Hodebert, 1991
 Trechus martinae J.Schmidt, 2009
 Trechus martinezi Jeannel, 1927
 Trechus matejkai Vsetecka, 1938
 Trechus mateui Deuve & Queinnec, 1985
 Trechus matrismeae Pawlowski, 1972
 Trechus mattisi J.Schmidt & Faille, 2018
 Trechus mauritanicus Jeannel, 1909
 Trechus meissonnieri Belousov & Kabak, 2000
 Trechus meixnerianus P.Moravec & Lompe in Löbl & Smetana, 2003
 Trechus mekbibi J.Schmidt & Faille, 2018
 Trechus melanocephalus Kolenati, 1845
 Trechus mengensis Belousov & Kabak, 2020
 Trechus menpa J.Schmidt, 2016
 Trechus merditanus Apfelbeck, 1906
 Trechus meregallii Casale, 1983
 Trechus merenicus Belousov & Kabak, 1994
 Trechus merkli Pawlowski, 1973
 Trechus meschniggi Jeannel, 1930
 Trechus messoulii Casale, 2011
 Trechus metrius Jeannel, 1935
 Trechus meurguesianus Deuve, 1980
 Trechus michaeli Pawlowski, 1978
 Trechus micrangulus Reitter, 1913
 Trechus midas Jeannel, 1927
 Trechus mieheorum J.Schmidt, 2009
 Trechus mila J.Schmidt, 2016
 Trechus minaicus Belousov & Kabak, 1994
 Trechus mingguangensis Deuve & Liang, 2016
 Trechus minioculatus Machado, 1987
 Trechus minitrechus J.Schmidt & Faille, 2018
 Trechus minshanicola Deuve, 2004
 Trechus minyops Wollaston, 1862
 Trechus mirzayani Morvan, 1974
 Trechus mitchellensis Barr, 1962
 Trechus mitjaevi Belousov & Kabak, 1996
 Trechus moctezuma Mateu, 1974
 Trechus modestus Putzeys, 1874
 Trechus mogul Belousov & Kabak, 2001
 Trechus mongolicus P.Moravec, 1992
 Trechus mongolorum Belousov & Kabak, 1994
 Trechus montanellus Gemminger & Harold, 1868
 Trechus montanheirorum Oromi & Borges, 1991  (Cave ground-beetle)
 Trechus montanus Motschulsky, 1844
 Trechus montisarerae Focarile, 1950
 Trechus montismaiellettae Ghidini, 1932
 Trechus montisrosae Jeannel, 1921
 Trechus montreuili Deuve, 2004
 Trechus morandinii Lebenbauer, 2002
 Trechus mordkovitschi Shilenkov, 1982
 Trechus morvanellus Deuve, 1996
 Trechus morvanianus Deuve & Queinnec, 1985
 Trechus mourzinellus Deuve, 1998
 Trechus mouzaiensis Jeannel, 1922
 Trechus muguensis J.Schmidt, 2009
 Trechus murzorum Belousov & Kabak, 1994
 Trechus muscorum P.Moravec & Wrase, 1998
 Trechus myanmarensis Deuve, 2004

N

 Trechus nairicus Pavesi & Sciaky, 1992
 Trechus nakaguroi Ueno, 1960
 Trechus naldii Ghidini, 1932
 Trechus nami J.Schmidt, 2016
 Trechus namtsoensis J.Schmidt, 2009
 Trechus nannus Jeannel, 1935
 Trechus nantahalae Barr, 1979
 Trechus nanulus J.Schmidt & Faille, 2018
 Trechus naratensis Deuve, 1993
 Trechus narynensis Belousov & Kabak, 1992
 Trechus natmataungensis Donabauer, 2010
 Trechus navaricus (Vuillefroy, 1869)
 Trechus nebulosus Barr, 1962
 Trechus newar Deuve, 1988
 Trechus neyamensis J.Schmidt, 2016
 Trechus nezlobinskyi Hristovskyi, 2014
 Trechus nicoleae Moncoutier, 1986
 Trechus nigrans J.Schmidt, 2016
 Trechus nigrifemoralis J.Schmidt & Faille, 2018
 Trechus nigrinus Putzeys, 1847
 Trechus nigrocruciatus Wollaston, 1854
 Trechus nikolajevi Belousov & Kabak, 1992
 Trechus nivicola Chaudoir, 1846
 Trechus nomurai Ueno, 1998
 Trechus nonveilleri G.Müller, 1930
 Trechus noricus Meixner, 1911
 Trechus nothus Jeannel, 1960
 Trechus novaculosus Barr, 1962
 Trechus nugax Lompe, 1997
 Trechus numatai Ueno, 1967
 Trechus nyalamensis J.Schmidt, 2016

O

 Trechus obliquebasalis Breit, 1914
 Trechus obtusiusculus Ganglbauer, 1889
 Trechus obtusus Erichson, 1837
 Trechus ochreatus Dejean, 1831
 Trechus odontopeos Fresneda; Valenzuela; Bourdeau & Faille, 2019
 Trechus ofensis Donabauer, 2013
 Trechus ogouzicus Deuve & Queinnec, 1992
 Trechus oligophthalmus Jeannel, 1935
 Trechus oligops Bedel, 1896
 Trechus olympicus Piochard de la Brûlerie, 1876
 Trechus ongudaicus Belousov & Kabak, 1996
 Trechus onicus Belousov & Kabak, 1994
 Trechus oodes Jeannel, 1935
 Trechus opgenoorthi J.Schmidt, 2016
 Trechus oppositus J.Schmidt & Faille, 2018
 Trechus ordinarior Deuve & Queinnec, 1993
 Trechus orduensis Donabauer, 2007
 Trechus oregonensis Hatch, 1951
 Trechus ormayi Ganglbauer, 1891
 Trechus oromiensis Magrini; Queinnec & Vigna Taglianti, 2012
 Trechus oromii Borges; Serrano & Amorim, 2004  (Cave grround-beetle)
 Trechus orousseti (Perrault, 1982)
 Trechus orphaeus Pawlowski, 1973
 Trechus orthapicalis Belousov & Kabak, 1998
 Trechus ortizi Español, 1970
 Trechus osellai F.Battoni & Vigna Taglianti, 1994
 Trechus osmanilis K. & J.Daniel, 1902
 Trechus ossae B.V.Gueorguiev, 2010
 Trechus ovatus Putzeys, 1845
 Trechus ovipennis Motschulsky, 1845
 Trechus ovtshinnikovi Belousov & Kabak, 1992

P

 Trechus pachycerus Apfelbeck, 1918
 Trechus pallens Belousov & Kabak, 1994
 Trechus pallidulus Ganglbauer, 1891
 Trechus pamirensis Belousov & Kabak, 1996
 Trechus pamphylicus Jeanne, 1996
 Trechus paphlagonicus Maran, 1940
 Trechus parapandus Ortuño, 2015
 Trechus parvifrater J.Schmidt, 2016
 Trechus patrizii Jeannel, 1960
 Trechus pavlovskii Jeannel, 1962
 Trechus pecignai Toribio, 1992
 Trechus pennisii Magrini, 1984
 Trechus pereirai Borges; Serrano & Amorim, 2004  (Cave ground-beetle)
 Trechus perissus Andrewes, 1936
 Trechus perpusillus Mateu & Deuve, 1979
 Trechus perreaui Deuve & Queinnec, 1985
 Trechus pertyi Heer, 1837
 Trechus peynei Magrini & Sciaky, 2006
 Trechus phaeocerus Jeannel, 1935
 Trechus phagunensis J.Schmidt, 2016
 Trechus phami Deuve, 1981
 Trechus phanageriacus Belousov, 1990
 Trechus piazzolii Focarile, 1950
 Trechus picoensis Machado, 1988  (Cave ground-beetle)
 Trechus pieltaini Jeannel, 1920
 Trechus pilisensis Csiki, 1918
 Trechus pilonensis Toribio, 2014
 Trechus pilosicornis Deuve & Queinnec, 1993
 Trechus pilosipennis Jeannel, 1954
 Trechus pinkeri Ganglbauer, 1891
 Trechus pirinicus Pawlowski, 1972
 Trechus pisgahensis Barr, 1979
 Trechus pisuenensis Ortuño & Toribio, 2005
 Trechus placidus Jeannel, 1962
 Trechus planioculus Belousov & Kabak, 1993
 Trechus planipennis Rosenhauer, 1856
 Trechus planiusculus A.Costa, 1858
 Trechus platypterellus Belousov in Kryzhanovskij et al., 1995
 Trechus plicatulus L.Miller, 1868
 Trechus plottbalsamensis Donabauer, 2005
 Trechus pochoni Jeannel, 1939
 Trechus pohorjeensis Donabauer, 2006
 Trechus polonorum Pawlowski, 1979
 Trechus pomonae Fall, 1901
 Trechus pongensis Fresneda; Valenzuela; Bourdeau & Faille, 2019
 Trechus priapus K.Daniel, 1902
 Trechus processifer Belousov & Kabak, 1992
 Trechus promeces Jeannel, 1935
 Trechus przewalskyi Belousov & Kabak, 1993
 Trechus pseudoalmonius Deuve, 1993
 Trechus pseudoalyshensis Deuve & Queinnec, 1992
 Trechus pseudobarberi Donabauer, 2009
 Trechus pseudocholaensis Deuve, 1998
 Trechus pseudogansuensis Belousov & Kabak, 2000
 Trechus pseudokozlovi Deuve, 2011
 Trechus pseudolatus Lompe, 2011
 Trechus pseudomontanellus Rizun, 1994
 Trechus pseudonovaculosus Donabauer, 2005
 Trechus pseudopiceus K. & J.Daniel, 1898
 Trechus pseudoqiqiensis Deuve & Liang, 2016
 Trechus pseudosubtilis Donabauer, 2009
 Trechus puetzi P.Moravec & Wrase, 1998
 Trechus pulchellus Putzeys, 1845
 Trechus pulpani Reska, 1965
 Trechus pulvinipenis Belousov & Kabak, 1999
 Trechus pumilio Jeannel, 1923
 Trechus pumilus Jeannel, 1927
 Trechus pumoensis Deuve, 1998
 Trechus putchkovi Belousov & Kabak, 1996
 Trechus putzeysi Pandellé, 1867
 Trechus pyrenaeus Dejean, 1831

Q

 Trechus qagcaensis Deuve, 1996
 Trechus qinghaicus Deuve & Queinnec, 1993
 Trechus qingmaiensis Deuve, 2011
 Trechus qiqiensis Deuve & Kavanaugh, 2016
 Trechus quadrimaculatus Motschulsky, 1850
 Trechus quadristriatus (Schrank, 1781)
 Trechus quarelicus Belousov, 1987
 Trechus qunlaishanicus Belousov & Kabak, 2020

R

 Trechus raffrayanus Jeannel, 1954
 Trechus rambouseki Breit, 1909
 Trechus ramseyensis Donabauer, 2005
 Trechus rarus J.Schmidt, 2009
 Trechus ravasinianus Lorenz, 1998
 Trechus regularis Putzeys, 1870
 Trechus relictus Magrini; Queinnec & Vigna Taglianti, 2012
 Trechus religiosus J.Schmidt, 2009
 Trechus renei Belousov, 1990
 Trechus rhilensis Kaufmann, 1884
 Trechus rhodopeius Jeannel, 1921
 Trechus rhombus Belousov & Kabak, 2019
 Trechus riberai Fresneda; Valenzuela; Bourdeau & Faille, 2019
 Trechus rira J.Schmidt & Faille, 2018
 Trechus rivulis Dajoz, 2005
 Trechus roanicus Barr, 1962
 Trechus robustapicalis Belousov & Kabak, 1998
 Trechus rolwalingensis J.Schmidt, 2009
 Trechus ronchettii Reitter, 1911
 Trechus roparzhemoni Morvan, 1982
 Trechus rosenbergi Barr, 1962
 Trechus rotroui Antoine, 1934
 Trechus rotundatus Dejean, 1831
 Trechus rotundicollis (Basilewsky, 1974)
 Trechus rotundipennis (Duftschmid, 1812)
 Trechus rougemonti (Basilewsky, 1975)
 Trechus rougemontiellus Belousov, 2017
 Trechus rouxi Deuve, 1995
 Trechus rouxioides Deuve, 2005
 Trechus rubens (Fabricius, 1792)
 Trechus rudolphi Ganglbauer, 1891
 Trechus rufulus Dejean, 1831
 Trechus ruthi Jeannel, 1929

S

 Trechus sachalinensis Lafer, 1989
 Trechus safranboluensis Donabauer, 2004
 Trechus sagax Jeannel, 1960
 Trechus saglensis Shilenkov, 1998
 Trechus sajanensis P.Moravec, 1993
 Trechus sajuncaicus Monguzzi, 2002
 Trechus salassus Jeannel, 1927
 Trechus saluki Belousov & Kabak, 2019
 Trechus sambylensis Belousov & Kabak, 1994
 Trechus sanettii J.Schmidt & Faille, 2018
 Trechus santaluciaensis Donabauer, 2014
 Trechus satanicus Barr, 1962
 Trechus saulcyanus Csiki, 1928
 Trechus sauricus Belousov & Kabak, 1992
 Trechus saxicola Putzeys, 1870
 Trechus sbordonii Vigna Taglianti, 1967
 Trechus scapulatus Belousov & Kabak, 1993
 Trechus schaufussi Putzeys, 1870
 Trechus schaumii Pandellé, 1867
 Trechus schillhammeri Donabauer, 2006
 Trechus schimperanus Jeannel, 1954
 Trechus schmalfussi Baehr, 1983
 Trechus schoenmanni Donabauer & Lebenbauer, 2005
 Trechus schuelkei P.Moravec & Wrase, 1998
 Trechus schuhi Donabauer, 2007
 Trechus schwarzi Jeannel, 1931
 Trechus schwienbacheri Donabauer & Lebenbauer, 2003
 Trechus schyberosiae Szallies & Schüle, 2011
 Trechus sciakyellus Deuve, 2001
 Trechus scitus Jeannel, 1960
 Trechus scotti Jeannel, 1936
 Trechus sculptipennis J.Schmidt, 2009
 Trechus selaensis Deuve, 2006
 Trechus semenovi Belousov & Kabak, 1992
 Trechus sendrai (Comas & Mateu, 2008)
 Trechus seserligensis Shilenkov, 1998
 Trechus sessitanus Monguzzi, 1985
 Trechus setitemporalis Deuve, 2005
 Trechus shaanxiensis P.Moravec & Wrase, 1998
 Trechus shaid Belousov & Kabak, 1998
 Trechus shakhensis Belousov, 1987
 Trechus shangensis Belousov & Kabak, 2020
 Trechus sharpi Jeannel, 1921
 Trechus shatrovskyi Belousov & Kabak, 1994
 Trechus shchurovi Belousov & Kabak, 1996
 Trechus shibalicus Deuve & Kavanaugh, 2016
 Trechus shilenkovi Belousov & Kabak, 1992
 Trechus shinganensis Shilenkov, 1998
 Trechus shivalensis Belousov & Kabak, 1998
 Trechus shiyueliang Deuve & Liang, 2016
 Trechus sichuanus Deuve, 1988
 Trechus signatus Wollaston, 1857
 Trechus sikhotealinus Ueno & Lafer, 1994
 Trechus silveiranus Lompe, 1997
 Trechus simienensis Jeannel, 1954
 Trechus simplicens Belousov & Kabak, 1993
 Trechus singularis J.Schmidt, 2009
 Trechus sinuatus Schaum, 1860
 Trechus sinus Belousov & Kabak, 2001
 Trechus sivellae Monguzzi, 2002
 Trechus sjostedti Alluaud, 1927
 Trechus skoupyi P.Moravec & Zieris, 1998
 Trechus smetanai Deuve, 2017
 Trechus snowbirdensis Donabauer, 2005
 Trechus sodalis Jeannel, 1960
 Trechus sogdianus Belousov & Kabak, 1998
 Trechus sokolovi Belousov, 1990
 Trechus solarii Jeannel, 1921
 Trechus solhoeyi J.Schmidt, 2009
 Trechus soma Mateu & Deuve, 1979
 Trechus songoricus Belousov & Kabak, 1992
 Trechus sotshiensis Belousov, 1987
 Trechus splendens Gemminger & Harold, 1868
 Trechus stanovskyi P.Moravec, 1993
 Trechus stefanschoedli Donabauer, 2005
 Trechus stenoderus Jeannel, 1935
 Trechus stictulus Belousov & Kabak, 1998
 Trechus stipraisi Belousov & Kabak, 1992
 Trechus straneoi Jeannel, 1931
 Trechus strasseri Ganglbauer, 1891
 Trechus stratiotes J.Schmidt, 2009
 Trechus striatulus Putzeys, 1847
 Trechus stricticollis Jeannel, 1927
 Trechus strigipennis Kiesenwetter, 1861
 Trechus strongylus Jeannel, 1935
 Trechus stupkai Barr, 1979
 Trechus suan Belousov & Kabak, 1994
 Trechus subacuminatus A.Fleischer, 1898
 Trechus subcordatus Chaudoir, 1846
 Trechus sublaevis Raffray, 1886
 Trechus subnotatus Dejean, 1831
 Trechus subtilis Barr, 1962
 Trechus subzoigeicola Deuve, 2009
 Trechus suensoni Jeannel, 1957
 Trechus suluk Belousov & Kabak, 1996
 Trechus sundukovi P.Moravec & Wrase, 1997
 Trechus suopoensis Belousov & Kabak, 2020
 Trechus surkiensis Deuve, 2004
 Trechus susamyrensis Belousov & Kabak, 1992
 Trechus suturalis Putzeys, 1870
 Trechus svanicus Belousov, 1989
 Trechus sylviae Lompe, 2000
 Trechus sylviahofmannae J.Schmidt, 2017
 Trechus sylvicola K. & J.Daniel, 1898
 Trechus szujeckii Pawlowski, 1972

T

 Trechus taghizadehi Morvan, 1974
 Trechus talassicus Belousov & Kabak, 1992
 Trechus talequah Barr, 1962
 Trechus talgarensis Jeannel, 1927
 Trechus tamangi J.Schmidt, 1998
 Trechus tarbagataicus Belousov & Kabak, 1992
 Trechus tardokijanensis Lafer, 1989
 Trechus tatai Reboleira; Ortuño; Goncalves & Oromi, 2010
 Trechus tchibiloevi Anichtchenko, 2009
 Trechus teberdanus Jeannel, 1960
 Trechus teletskianus Belousov & Kabak, 1994
 Trechus tennesseensis Barr, 1962
 Trechus tenoensis Israelson & Palm, 1979
 Trechus tentek Belousov & Kabak, 1996
 Trechus tenuilimbatus K. & J.Daniel, 1898
 Trechus tenuiscapus Lindroth, 1961
 Trechus terceiranus Machado, 1988  (Cave ground-beetle)
 Trechus terrabravensis Borges; Serrano & Amorim, 2004  (Ground-beetle)
 Trechus terskeiensis Belousov & Kabak, 1992
 Trechus tesnensis Belousov & Kabak, 1999
 Trechus tetracoderus Gemminger & Harold, 1868
 Trechus teverganus Toribio, 2015
 Trechus tewoicus Deuve, 2009
 Trechus thai Deuve, 1995
 Trechus thaleri Franz, 1991
 Trechus thessalicus Meixner, 1928
 Trechus thessalonicus Jeannel, 1930
 Trechus thibetanus Jeannel, 1928
 Trechus thomasbarri Donabauer, 2005
 Trechus thorungiensis J.Schmidt, 1994
 Trechus thunderheadensis Donabauer, 2005
 Trechus tianchi Perreau, 1992
 Trechus tianshanivagus Deuve, 1993
 Trechus tilitshoensis J.Schmidt, 1994
 Trechus tingitanus Putzeys, 1870
 Trechus tishetshkini Belousov & Kabak, 1994
 Trechus tobiasi Donabauer, 2005
 Trechus toksanbaicus Belousov & Kabak, 1993
 Trechus tolucensis Bolivar y Pieltain, 1941
 Trechus tonitru Barr, 1962
 Trechus topaz Belousov & Kabak, 1998
 Trechus torgaut Belousov & Kabak, 2019
 Trechus toroticus Belousov & Kabak, 1996
 Trechus torrentialis Apfelbeck, 1908
 Trechus torressalai Ortuño & Arillo, 2005
 Trechus torretassoi Jeannel, 1937  (Ground-beetle)
 Trechus toxawayi Barr, 1979
 Trechus trachypachys Sciaky & Pavesi, 1995
 Trechus tragelaphus J.Schmidt & Faille, 2018
 Trechus transversicollis J.Schmidt & Faille, 2018
 Trechus triamicorum Ortuño & Jimenez-Valverde, 2011
 Trechus tristiculus K. & J.Daniel, 1898
 Trechus tsampa J.Schmidt, 2009
 Trechus tsanmensis Belousov & Kabak, 2019
 Trechus tseringi J.Schmidt, 2009
 Trechus tshildebaevi Belousov & Kabak, 1992
 Trechus tshitsherini Belousov, 1987
 Trechus tuckaleechee Barr, 1962
 Trechus tumidus Jeannel, 1921
 Trechus turgenicus Belousov & Kabak, 1994
 Trechus turkestanicus Belousov & Kabak, 1992
 Trechus turnai Deuve & Queinnec, 1993
 Trechus turnaianus Deuve, 1993
 Trechus turnaioides Deuve, 1998
 Trechus turukensis Belousov & Kabak, 1992
 Trechus tusquitee Barr, 1979
 Trechus tusquitensis Donabauer, 2005
 Trechus tuxeni Jeannel, 1957
 Trechus tychus Jeannel, 1960
 Trechus tyrrhenicus Jeannel, 1927
 Trechus tyshkanensis Deuve & Queinnec, 1992

U

 Trechus udiensis Ortuño, 2017
 Trechus uenyeensis Donabauer, 2006
 Trechus ulrichi Pawlowski, 1976
 Trechus umbricola Wollaston, 1854
 Trechus uncifer Barr, 1962
 Trechus unicoi Barr, 1979
 Trechus urartaeus Pavesi & Sciaky, 1994
 Trechus usgentensis Belousov & Kabak, 1998
 Trechus utschderensis Reitter, 1890
 Trechus utsi J.Schmidt, 2016
 Trechus uygur Deuve, 1993
 Trechus uygurorum Belousov & Kabak, 1994
 Trechus uyttenboogaarti Jeannel, 1936

V

 Trechus valbonensis Jeannel, 1927
 Trechus valentinei Barr, 1979
 Trechus valenzuelai Fresneda; Bourdeau & Faille, 2015
 Trechus validicollis Sciaky & Pavesi, 1995
 Trechus validipes K.Daniel, 1902
 Trechus valikhanovi Belousov & Kabak, 1993
 Trechus vallestris K. & J.Daniel, 1898
 Trechus vandykei (Jeannel, 1927)
 Trechus varendorffi Sainte-Claire Deville, 1903
 Trechus verus Barr, 1962
 Trechus vietnamicus Ueno, 1995
 Trechus vignai Casale, 1979
 Trechus viti Pawlowski, 1977

W

 Trechus wagneri Ganglbauer, 1906
 Trechus walteri Pawlowski, 1978
 Trechus wayahbaldensis Donabauer, 2005
 Trechus weiratheri Jeannel, 1929
 Trechus weiserti Donabauer, 2007
 Trechus weixiensis Belousov & Kabak, 2000
 Trechus wiersbowskyi J.Schmidt & Faille, 2018
 Trechus winkleri Jeannel, 1927
 Trechus witkowskii Pawlowski, 1978
 Trechus wittmeri Ueno, 1977
 Trechus wrzecionkoellus Deuve, 2011
 Trechus wrzecionkoi Deuve, 1996
 Trechus wrzecionkoianus Deuve, 2005
 Trechus wutaicola (Deuve, 1988)

X Y Z

 Trechus xiei Deuve, 1992
 Trechus xinjiangensis Deuve, 1992
 Trechus xiwuensis Deuve, 1996
 Trechus yak J.Schmidt, 2009
 Trechus yanoi Jeannel, 1937
 Trechus yaralensis Belousov & Kabak, 2000
 Trechus yasudai Ueno, 1973
 Trechus yengensis Morvan, 1982
 Trechus yeti J.Schmidt, 2009
 Trechus yvesbousqueti Donabauer, 2010
 Trechus zaerensis Antoine, 1928
 Trechus zamotajlovi Belousov, 1990
 Trechus zangherii Jeannel, 1927
 Trechus zarandicus P.Moravec, 1986
 Trechus zaslavskii Jeannel, 1962
 Trechus zetteli Donabauer, 2007
 Trechus zhabyk Belousov & Kabak, 1994
 Trechus zhangi Deuve, 1989
 Trechus zhaosuensis Deuve, 2004
 Trechus zhdankoi Belousov & Kabak, 1992
 Trechus zhugquicus Deuve, 2009
 Trechus ziganensis Jeanne, 1976
 Trechus zinovievi Belousov & Kabak, 1996
 Trechus zintshenkoi Belousov & Kabak, 1999
 Trechus zoigeicola Belousov & Kabak, 2000
 Trechus zoigensis Deuve, 1989
 Trechus zolotikhini Belousov, 1990
 Trechus zonguldakensis Donabauer, 2004
 Trechus zorgatii Quéinnec & Ollivier, 2013
 Trechus zvarici Belousov & Kabak, 2000

Extinct
 † Trechus balticus J.Schmidt & Faille, 2015
 † Trechus capito Forster, 1891
 † Trechus eoanophthalmus J.Schmidt; Hoffmann & Michalik, 2016
 † Trechus exhibitorius J.Schmidt; Belousov & Michalik, 2016
 † Trechus fractus Wickham, 1912

References

External links

Trechus at Fauna Europaea

 
Trechinae